Yoon Jung-Chun (18 February 1973 - 1 September 2014) was a South Korean footballer and football coach.

References

External links 

1973 births
2014 deaths
Association football midfielders
South Korean footballers
Jeju United FC players
Daejeon Hana Citizen FC players
Gyeongju Citizen FC players
K League 1 players
K3 League players